Manchester Orchestra is an indie rock band from Atlanta, Georgia, United States.

"Manchester Orchestra" may also refer to any of the following orchestras based in Manchester, United Kingdom:
 The Manchester Camerata, chamber orchestra
 The Hallé, symphony orchestra
 The BBC Philharmonic, symphony orchestra